Alfred Probst (1894 – April 1958) was a Swiss rower who competed in the 1924 Summer Olympics. In 1924 he won the gold medal with the Swiss boat in the coxed fours event. He was also part of the Swiss boat which won the bronze medal in the coxless four competition.

References

External links
 
 
 

1894 births
1958 deaths
Swiss male rowers
Olympic bronze medalists for Switzerland
Olympic gold medalists for Switzerland
Olympic rowers of Switzerland
Rowers at the 1924 Summer Olympics
Olympic medalists in rowing
Medalists at the 1924 Summer Olympics
European Rowing Championships medalists